George Murray (born 16 May 1942) is a Scottish former professional footballer who played as a wing half.

Career
Born in Bellshill, Murray played for Kilmarnock Amateurs, Motherwell and Aberdeen.

Murray was caretaker manager of Aberdeen for four matches in 1975.

Between 1981 and 1983 Murray was head coach of Canberra Arrows in the Australian National Soccer League.

His younger brother Cammy was also a footballer, mainly for St Mirren.

References

1942 births
Living people
Scottish footballers
Motherwell F.C. players
Aberdeen F.C. players
Scottish Football League players
Association football wing halves
Scotland under-23 international footballers
Aberdeen F.C. non-playing staff
Scottish Football League representative players
Scottish football managers
Aberdeen F.C. managers
Scottish expatriate football managers
Scottish expatriates in Australia
Expatriate soccer managers in Australia
Footballers from Bellshill